Luís Carlos Almada Soares (born 16 April 1986), commonly known as Platini, is a Cape Verdean professional footballer who plays as a winger.

He spent five years of his professional career in Portugal in addition to playing in seven other countries, and chose his name in honour of French international Michel Platini.

Platini made his international debut for Cape Verde in 2012, and represented the country at two Africa Cup of Nations tournaments.

Club career

Portugal
Born in Praia, Cape Verde, Platini started playing football for the local team Sporting Clube da Praia, making his debut in 2006. He moved to Portugal in 2008, joining Associação Académica de Coimbra.

Platini never appeared officially for the Students, who loaned him to two Portuguese Second Division clubs in consecutive seasons, G.D. Tourizense and Sertanense FC. In the summer of 2010 he signed a three-year contract with C.D. Santa Clara of the Segunda Liga, appearing in 19 games for the Azores team in his first year, 11 as a substitute; one of his two goals came on 31 October 2010, in a 2–0 home win against C.F. Os Belenenses.

Later years
On 22 June 2013, Platini joined Cypriot First Division side AC Omonia. In July of the following year, he signed for two seasons with PFC CSKA Sofia from Bulgaria. He returned to Africa to play for Egypt's Al Ittihad Alexandria Club, but left in January 2016 alleging that he had not been paid for five months.

In the summer of 2017, after ending his contract with Dibba Al-Hisn Sports Club from the United Arab Emirates, Platini moved to Romanian club CSM Politehnica Iași on a two-year deal. On 26 October, he scored the only goal in the 1–0 victory over FC Steaua București.

Platini agreed to a one-year contract with Sanat Naft Abadan F.C. of the Iran Pro League on 29 June 2018. He played their first five matches of the season, then returned to Iași in September.

International career
Platini made his debut for Cape Verde in 2012. He scored the Blue Sharks' first goal in the 2013 Africa Cup of Nations – also a first-ever in the tournament – opening the scoring in the 1–1 draw against Morocco in Durban.

Career statistics

International

International goals
 (Cape Verde score listed first, score column indicates score after each Platini goal)

Honours

Club
Sporting Praia
Cape Verdean Championship: 2007, 2008
Santiago South Premier Division: 2007–08

References

External links
	

1986 births
Living people
Sportspeople from Praia
Cape Verdean footballers
Association football wingers
Sporting Clube da Praia players
Liga Portugal 2 players
Segunda Divisão players
Associação Académica de Coimbra – O.A.F. players
G.D. Tourizense players
Sertanense F.C. players
C.D. Santa Clara players
Cypriot First Division players
AC Omonia players
First Professional Football League (Bulgaria) players
PFC CSKA Sofia players
Egyptian Premier League players
Al Ittihad Alexandria Club players
UAE First Division League players
Dibba Al-Hisn Sports Club players
Liga I players
FC Politehnica Iași (2010) players
Persian Gulf Pro League players
Sanat Naft Abadan F.C. players
Cape Verde international footballers
2013 Africa Cup of Nations players
2015 Africa Cup of Nations players
Cape Verdean expatriate footballers
Expatriate footballers in Portugal
Expatriate footballers in Cyprus
Expatriate footballers in Bulgaria
Expatriate footballers in Egypt
Expatriate footballers in the United Arab Emirates
Expatriate footballers in Romania
Expatriate footballers in Iran
Cape Verdean expatriate sportspeople in Portugal
Cape Verdean expatriate sportspeople in Cyprus
Cape Verdean expatriate sportspeople in Bulgaria
Cape Verdean expatriate sportspeople in Egypt
Cape Verdean expatriate sportspeople in the United Arab Emirates
Cape Verdean expatriate sportspeople in Romania